The island nation of Jamaica is one of the regions which makes up the West Indies cricket team. It has produced international cricketers in all forms of the game—Tests, One Day Internationals (ODIs) and Twenty20 Internationals (T20Is). Freddie Martin and Karl Nunes became the first Jamaicans to play international cricket when they appeared in the West Indies's inaugural Test match, against England in 1928. Nunes captained the West Indies during this match, the first of seven Jamaicans to do so.

Chris Gayle has scored the most runs by a Jamaican in Tests, ODIs and T20Is. He is also the highest overall scorer for the West Indies in both ODIs with 10480 runs and T20Is with 1889 runs. Courtney Walsh, who has also captained the West Indies, has taken the most wickets by a Jamaican in Tests and ODIs. He is also the highest wicket taking West Indian in Tests and ODIs, having taken 519 and 227 wickets respectively. Alf Valentine and Jerome Taylor are the only other Jamaicans to have taken 100 or more wickets in test matches. Along with that, Gayle and Taylor are the only other Jamaicans to take 100 or more wickets in one day internationals. With 132 appearances, Walsh has also played the most matches by a West Indian in Tests.

Key
 Apps denotes the number of appearances the player has made.
 Runs denotes the number of runs scored by the player.
 Wkts denotes the number of wickets taken by the player.

Statistics correct as of: October 2022

Notes
 Gayle played 3 ODIs for the ICC World XI

See also
List of West Indies Test cricketers
List of West Indies ODI cricketers
List of West Indies Twenty20 International cricketers

References

International